Robert J. Cabral Station (called Stockton – Downtown station or Stockton ACE station by Amtrak), is a railway station in Stockton, California. In 2003, the station building was named in honor of the late Robert J. Cabral, a San Joaquin County supervisor instrumental in the creation of the Altamont Corridor Express (ACE), originally Altamont Commuter Express.

Cabral Station is one of two train stations in Stockton. This station is the terminus for the ACE line to San Jose's Diridon Station and is also served by Amtrak San Joaquins trains between Sacramento and Bakersfield. San Joaquins trains between Oakland and Bakersfield do not pass this station and instead use Stockton – San Joaquin Street station.

History 

The station building was built by the Southern Pacific Railroad in 1930, replacing an earlier Stockton station located a few blocks to the south.

The overall design of the station is based on Italian Renaissance and Spanish Revival prototypes. It follows the classical Palladian five-part plan in which there is a center block connected to two end wings by hyphens. The brick building includes extensive terracotta detailing, such as stylized rope around the large arched windows and a wide frieze that runs around the structure.

Passenger trains to the station were discontinued in 1972. Abandoned in the early 1980s, the depot fell into disrepair.

Altamont Commuter Express service commenced operations with Stockton as its terminus in 1998, and the San Joaquin started service here the following year. In 2001, the San Joaquin Regional Rail Commission (SJRRC), which provides ACE, purchased the old depot for $236,000 (equivalent to $ in  adjusted for inflation). Within a year, plans were drawn up for a full $6.5 million restoration that was completed in 2003. The majority of the funds came through "Measure K," a local voter-approved ½ cent sales tax dedicated to transportation improvement projects.

The station exterior was updated in early 2010 with improvements to the parking lot and landscaping, including added handicapped parking.

When originally constructed, the track closest to the Cabral Station platform was a dead-end tail track. This layout made it impossible for San Joaquins trains to stop at the platform. Instead, passengers loaded from the Weber Road grade crossing. In 2015, the platform track was extended north and tied back into the mainline, allowing Amtrak trains to serve the station platform.

Connections 
San Joaquin Regional Transit District (RTD) Express route 44, a bus rapid transit service stops at the station, offering service every 20 to 30 minutes to the Downtown Transit Center and Union Transfer Station, major hubs for the RTD bus system. The Downtown Transit Center is also located five blocks west of the station.

Two Amtrak Thruway routes serve this station. Route 3 buses connects passengers to the other station in Stockton, Sacramento, Chico and Redding. At this station, Route 6 connects passengers to San Jose using ACE trains.

References

External links 

 ACE Station Information

Amtrak stations in San Joaquin County, California
Altamont Corridor Express stations in San Joaquin County, California
Railway stations in the United States opened in 1930
Stockton
Buildings and structures in Stockton, California
1930 establishments in California
Railway stations closed in 1972
Railway stations in the United States opened in 1998